Klaudia Boczová (born 22 December 1990) is a former Slovak tennis player.

In her career, she won four singles titles and five doubles titles on the ITF Circuit. In May 2009, she reached her best singles ranking of world No. 261. On 18 May 2009, she peaked at No. 363 in the doubles rankings.

Born in Bratislava, Boczová played collegiate tennis in the United States for San Jose State University during 2012–2013.

Junior years
In 2005, she played for Slovakia the European Youth Summer Olympic Festival in Lignano Sabbiadoro (Italy) where she won the bronze medal in women's singles and mixed doubles.

In 2007, she reached the Australian Open semifinals with fellow Slovak Kristína Kučová, losing to the eventual champions and third seeds, Evgeniya Rodina and Arina Rodionova. She also made the French Open and US Open quarterfinals with Kučová, losing to the eventual champions and third seeds, Ksenia Milevskaya and Urszula Radwańska.

Boczová won the 48th Trofeo Bonfiglio in the doubles event, again partnering Kučová.

ITF Junior Circuit finals

Singles: 6 (2 titles, 4 runner–ups)

Doubles: 20 (11 titles, 9 runner–ups)

ITF finals

Singles: 7 (4 titles, 3 runner–ups)

Doubles: 7 (5 titles, 2 runner–ups)

References

External links
 
 
 San Jose State University profile

1990 births
Living people
Tennis players from Bratislava
Slovak female tennis players
San Jose State Spartans women's tennis players
Slovak expatriate sportspeople in the United States